This is a list of the most expensive divorces in legal history. Amounts are given in U.S. dollars, and are not adjusted for inflation, unless explicitly stated so as a separate figure.

Most expensive divorces 
 Jeff Bezos's divorce in 2019 from MacKenzie Bezos; is the most expensive divorce with MacKenzie Bezos getting $38 billion ($ billion inflation adjusted).
 Alec Wildenstein's divorce in 1999 from Jocelyn Wildenstein; $3.8 billion ($ billion inflation adjusted).
 Kim Kardashian and Kanye West's $2.7 billion divorce, plus $200,000 per month child support paid by West.
 Rupert Murdoch's divorce in 1999 from Anna; estimated at $1.7 billion ($ billion inflation adjusted).
 Bernie Ecclestone's divorce in 2009 from Slavica; estimated at $1.2 billion ($ billion inflation adjusted).
 Steve Wynn's divorce in 2010 from Elaine; estimated at $1 billion ($ billion inflation adjusted).
 Harold Hamm's divorce in 2012 from Sue Ann Arnall; estimated at $974.8 million ($ billion inflation adjusted).
 Adnan Khashoggi's divorce in 1980 after 20 years from Soraya Khashoggi; estimated at $874 million ($ billion inflation adjusted).
 Mohammed bin Rashid Al Maktoum's divorce in 2019 after 15 years from Haya bint Hussein; estimated at $730 million ($787 million inflation adjusted).
 Tiger Woods' divorce in 2010 after 5 or 6 years from Elin Nordegren in August 2010; estimated at $710 million. ($ million inflation adjusted)
 Dmitry Rybolovlev's divorce in 2014 after 26 or 27 years from Elena; estimated at $604 million ($ million inflation adjusted).
 Craig McCaw's divorce in 1997 after 21 years from Wendy McCaw; estimated to exceed $460 million ($ million inflation adjusted).
 Mel Gibson's divorce in 2006 after 26 years from Robyn Moore Gibson; estimated at $425 million ($ million inflation adjusted).
 Robert L. Johnson's divorce in 2001 after 31 or 32 years from Sheila Johnson: estimated at $400 million ($ million inflation adjusted).
 Roman Abramovich's divorce in 2007 after 15 or 16 years from Irina Abramovich; estimated at $300 million ($ million inflation adjusted).
 Charles Edgar Fipke's divorce in 2000 from Marlene Fipke; estimated at $200 million ($ million inflation adjusted).
 Invenergy's Michael Polsky's divorce from Maya Polsky, $184 million ($ million inflation adjusted).
 Michael Jordan's divorce in 2006 after 16 or 17 years from Juanita Jordan, $168 million ($ million inflation adjusted).
 Boris Berezovsky's divorce in 2010 after 18 or 19 years from Galina Besharova; estimated at $160 million ($ million inflation adjusted).
 Neil Diamond's divorce in 1994 or 1995 after 24, 25, or 26 years from Marcia Murphey; estimated at $150 million ($ or $ million inflation adjusted).
 Frank McCourt's divorce in 2011 after 31 or 32 years from Jamie McCourt; estimated at $130 million ($ million inflation adjusted).
 Harrison Ford's divorce in 2004 after 20 or 21 years from Melissa Mathison; estimated at $118 million ($ million inflation adjusted).
 Greg Norman's divorce in 2007 after 25 or 26 years from Laura Andrassy; estimated at $103 million ($ million inflation adjusted).
 Steven Spielberg's divorce in 1989 after 3 or 4 years from Amy Irving; estimated at $100 million ($ million inflation adjusted).
 Madonna's divorce in 2008 after 7 or 8 years from Guy Ritchie; estimated at $76–$92 million ($-$ million inflation adjusted).
 Dr Khoo Kay Peng's divorce in 2017 after 46 or 47 years from Pauline Chai; estimated at $80 million ($ million inflation adjusted).
 Kevin Costner's divorce in 1994 after 15 or 16 years from Cindy Silva; estimated at $80 million ($ million inflation adjusted).
 Aga Khan IV's divorce in 2011 after 12 or 13 years from Inaara Aga Khan; estimated at $78 million ($ million inflation adjusted).
 Kenny Rogers divorce in 1993 after 15 or 16 years from Marianne Rogers; estimated at $60 million ($ million inflation adjusted).
 James Cameron's divorce in 1999 after 1 or 2 years from Linda Hamilton; estimated at $50 million ($ million inflation adjusted).
 Paul McCartney's divorce in 2008 after 5 or 6 years from Heather Mills; estimated at $48.6 million ($ million inflation adjusted).
 Phil Collins' divorce in 2008 for $45.7 million ($ million inflation adjusted).
 Michael Douglas's divorce in 1995 after 17 or 18 years from Diandra Douglas; estimated at $45 million ($ million inflation adjusted).
 Ewan McGregor divorce in 2020; half of his earnings over the past 20 years plus $432,000 per year spousal support and $180,000 per year child support.
 Ted Danson's divorce in 1993 after 15 or 16 years from Casey Coats; estimated at $30 million ($ million inflation adjusted).
 Donald Trump's divorce in 1991 after 13 or 14 years from Ivana Trump; estimated at $25 million ($ million inflation adjusted).
 Kelsey Grammer's divorce in 2011 after 13 or 14 years from Camille Grammer; estimated at $30 million ($ million inflation adjusted).
 Lionel Richie's divorce in 2004 after 8 or 9 years from Diane Richie; estimated at $20 million ($ million inflation adjusted).
 Johnny Carson's divorce in 1985 after 12 or 13 years from Joanna Holland; estimated at $20 million ($ million inflation adjusted).
 Mick Jagger's common-law marriage to Jerry Hall was voided in 1999; estimated between $15 and $25 million ($ and $ million inflation adjusted).
 Slash of Guns N' Roses divorce in 2014 after 12 or 13 years from Perla Farrar; $6.6 million ($ million inflation adjusted) plus $100,000 per month spousal support and $39,000 per month child support.

References

External links 
 The World's Most Expensive Divorce Settlements
 Top 10 Most Expensive Divorce Settlements.

Expense
Divorces
Divorces